Cnemaspis leucura, also known as the curse rock gecko, is a species of gecko endemic to Sarawak on Borneo.

References

Cnemaspis
Reptiles of Indonesia
Reptiles described in 2017